How to Build a Time Machine by Paul Davies is a 2002 physics book that discusses the possibilities of time travel. It was published by Penguin Books. In this book, Davies discusses why time is relative, how this relates to time travel, and then lays out a "blueprint" for a real time machine. This is explored whilst also discussing paradoxes which allow a more constructive approach. It is a realistic, albeit fantastical, book.

References

See also

About Time

Penguin Books books
2003 non-fiction books
Popular physics books
Literature about time travel
Books by Paul Davies